DYEN (107.1 FM), broadcasting as Barangay FM 107.1, is a radio station owned and operated by GMA Network Inc. The station's studio and transmitter are located at Door 10, 3rd Floor, Centroplex Mall, Gonzaga St., Bacolod.

References

External links

Radio stations in Bacolod
Radio stations established in 1997
Barangay FM stations